Kouk Prech Commune is a khum (commune) in Kiri Vong District, Takéo Province, Cambodia.

Administration 
As of 2019, Kouk Prech Commune has 13 phums (villages) as follows.

References 

Communes of Takéo province
Kiri Vong District